Albert Donald Matheson (19 March 1885 – 27 October 1934) was an Australian rules footballer who played for the Essendon Football Club in the Victorian Football League (VFL).

See also
 1911 Adelaide Carnival

Notes

References
 Albert Donald Matheson, at New South Wales Australian Football History Society.

External links 
		

1885 births
1934 deaths
Australian rules footballers from Victoria (Australia)
Essendon Football Club players